"The Piper" is a track from the 1980 album Super Trouper, by Swedish pop group ABBA. The song is loosely based on the famous story of The Pied Piper of Hamelin, but lyricist Björn Ulvaeus cites the novel The Stand by Stephen King as a source of inspiration. It is regarded by some ABBA fans as being very different from the more mainstream songs they had recorded until this time. In particular, the dark lyrics dealing with the seduction by fascistic leaders and a somewhat medieval sound (drums, flute, choral) are not seen in their earlier songs. It is also the only ABBA song where a part of the refrain is in Latin, and has gained a small cult following among ABBA fans.

ABBA: Uncensored on the Road explains that the song was also the flip-side of the single "Super Trouper"; while From ABBA to Mamma Mia!: The Official Book adds: After a two-week break in March for the concluding tour of Japan, by the end of April ABBA had completed the songs "Andante, Andante", "On And On And On", "Happy New Year", "Elaine" and "The Piper".

See also
"Me and I" (an ABBA song from the same album)
The Pied Piper of Hamelin

References

1980 songs
ABBA songs
Electronica songs
Songs about musicians
Songs based on fairy tales
Works based on Pied Piper of Hamelin